Prima scriptura is the Christian doctrine that canonized scripture is "first" or "above all" other sources of divine revelation. Implicitly, this view suggests that, besides canonical scripture, there can be other guides for what a believer should believe and how they should live, such as the Holy Spirit, created order, traditions, charismatic gifts, mystical insight, angelic visitations, conscience, common sense, the views of experts, the spirit of the times or something else. Prima scriptura suggests that ways of knowing or understanding God and his will that do not originate from canonized scripture are perhaps helpful in interpreting that scripture, but testable by the canon and correctable by it, if they seem to contradict the scriptures. Prima sciptura is upheld by the Anglican, Methodist and Pentecostal traditions of Christianity, which suggest that Scripture is the primary source for Christian doctrine, but that "tradition, experience, and reason" can nurture the Christian religion as long as they are in harmony with the Bible.

Contrast with sola scriptura
Prima scriptura is sometimes contrasted to sola scriptura, which literally translates "by the scripture alone". The former doctrine as understood by many Protestants—particularly Evangelicals—is that the Scriptures are the sole infallible rule of faith and practice, but that the Scriptures' meaning can be mediated through many kinds of secondary authority, such as the ordinary teaching offices of the Church, antiquity, the councils of the Christian Church, reason, and experience.

However, sola scriptura rejects any original infallible authority other than the Bible. In this view, all secondary authority is derived from the authority of the Scriptures and is therefore subject to reform when compared to the teaching of the Bible. Church councils, preachers, Bible commentators, private revelation, or even a message allegedly from an angel are not an original authority alongside the Bible in the sola scriptura approach.

Anabaptism
The Anabaptist approach to the Bible has been one that would be characterized as prima scriptura. This has been summarized in the "Principles for Reading Scripture", published by an Anabaptist catechesis-related apostolate, Sound Faith, organized by the Chambersburg Christian Fellowship congregation:

With these principles, Anabaptists use the writings of the Church Fathers, not to establish doctrine, but "to verify that we have read Scripture correctly, and to give us continuity with those who have based their lives on apostolic teaching through the ages."

Anglicanism
Article VI of the 39 Articles,  Of the Sufficiency of the Holy Scriptures for Salvation states:

The Anglican view of the role on prima scriptura can be best summarized by Richard Hooker. In his famous work "On the Laws of Ecclesiastical Polity" he developed a view that would be known in the Anglican tradition as the "3-legged stool". This consists of scripture, tradition and reason. Scripture is the source of all revelation in the Christian tradition. At the same time Hooker also saw the necessity of tradition, while not on the same level as scripture, as being an important mediating principle in interpreting. He specifically critiques the Puritan interpretations of sola scriptura that were present at the time in Elizabethan England. This is followed by what Hooker calls the "law of reason". Hookers' 3-legged stool would become the basis of the Methodist quadrilateral as well as form a via media between the Catholic and Lutheran understandings on the relationship between scripture and tradition.

Methodism

Another version of the prima scriptura approach may be the Wesleyan Quadrilateral for the Methodists, which maintains that Scripture is to be the primary authority for the Church.  Nonetheless, it is best interpreted through the lenses of reason, personal experience, and Church tradition, although the Bible remains the crucial and normative authority for Christians. According to the United Methodist Church, which adheres to this notion:

Roman Catholicism

The Dogmatic Constitution on Divine Revelation is clear on the total equality of Scripture with Sacred Tradition when it says that "both Sacred Tradition and Sacred Scripture are to be accepted and venerated with the same sense of loyalty and reverence" because together they "form one sacred deposit of the word of God, committed to the Church." So, in one sense, Scripture has no primacy over Tradition, but an ancient tradition holds that the word of God, though equally authoritative in whichever form it comes, comes primarily in the form of Sacred Scripture, and thus we should seek for Sacred Doctrine primarily in the Scriptures. As Thomas Aquinas said:

...[S]acred doctrine...properly uses the authority of the canonical Scriptures as an incontrovertible proof, and the authority of the doctors of the Church as one that may properly be used, yet merely as probable. For our faith rests upon the revelation made to the apostles and prophets who wrote the canonical books, and not on the revelations (if any such there are) made to other doctors.

For this reason, some sources say that prima scriptura is the normative Catholic approach. Yves Congar referred to prima scriptura as the "normative primacy of Scripture" as he described the work of Augustine of Hippo and Thomas Aquinas. Pope John Paul II in an address to academics in 1986 said, "Theology must take its point of departure from a continual and updated return to the Scriptures read in the Church." This statement has been taken by some as support for interpreting the Church's teaching in terms of the prima scriptura perspective.

Eastern Orthodoxy

Eastern Orthodoxy teaches that Scripture is neither above nor below Tradition, and that Scripture is part of the written Tradition of the Church. An analogy is made where the entirety of church life is compared to a jeweled necklace, of which the most precious gem is the large diamond in the center, representing scripture. The other gems represent other parts of the Holy Tradition. While none of the other jewels are equal to the diamond, they nonetheless contribute to its beauty; the diamond looks best as part of the whole necklace (i. e., when viewed within the context of Church tradition). Sola scriptura, which is analogous to ripping the diamond out of the necklace because one prefers to view it on its own, only detracts from the diamond's beauty and value.

Others

The Quaker Christian concept of the Inward light or the charismatic views of the Holy Spirit as an active force in the life of the believer may be examples of the prima scriptura approach.

While most Pentecostals and Charismatics believe the Bible to be the ultimate authority and would not say that any new revelation can ever contradict the Bible, they do believe that God continues to speak to people today on extra-biblical topics as well as to interpret and apply the text of the Bible.

Besides the Holy Scriptures, the Seventh-day Adventist Church hold Ellen White's writings to be "a continuing and authoritative source of truth which provide for the church." The Church of Jesus Christ of Latter-day Saints (LDS Church) accepts the Bible as the word of God "as far as it is translated correctly,"  and it regards parts of the Apocrypha, some writings of the Protestant Reformers and non-Christian religious leaders, and the non-religious writings of some philosophers - and, notably, the Constitution of the United States of America - to be inspired, though not canonical.

Jehovah's Witnesses believe that the interpretation of scripture and codification of doctrines is considered the responsibility of the Governing Body of Jehovah's Witnesses.

Christadelphians believe that the Bible is the sole source of instruction from God in terms of the way that they should conduct their affairs. However they do note that some translations of the bible into non-original languages have changed the message, so study of the original texts are important.

References

External links 
 (Baptist opinion)

Christian terminology
Christian theology of the Bible
Latin religious words and phrases
Catholic theology and doctrine
Eastern Orthodox theology